Geoffrey or Geoff Baker may refer to: 
 Geoffrey Baker (British Army officer) (1912–1980), head of the British Army
 Geoffrey Baker (cricketer) (born 1970), New Zealand cricketer
 Geoffrey Baker (rower), English rower
 Geoff Baker (journalist) (born 1968), Canadian-born journalist
 Geoff Baker (politician) (born 1969), member of the Western Australian Legislative Assembly

See also
 Geoffrey the Baker (died  1360), English chronicler